The Indian River is a river in Lanark County in Eastern Ontario, Canada. It is in the Saint Lawrence River drainage basin and is a left tributary of the Mississippi River.

Course
The river begins at an unnamed lake in geographic Lavant Township in the municipality of Lanark Highlands. It flows east into geographic Darling Township, under Lanark County Road 511 near the settlement of White, turns southeast, passes the settlement of Halls Mills on the border of geographic Lanark Township, and reaches Clayton Lake, where it takes in the outflow from Taylor Lake. The river passes into geographic Ramsay Township in the municipality of Mississippi Mills on the lake, and leaves over the Clayton Lake Dam at the settlement of Clayton. It heads northeast, takes in the right tributary Union Hall Creek, and passes through the Mill of Kintail Conservation Area, which has a former grist mill, and a former home of medical doctor, sculptor and Ramsay Township native R. Tait McKenzie. The mill is home to a museum to Mackenzie and to another famous native of Ramsay Township, inventor of basketball James Naismith.

Tributaries
Union Hall Creek (right)

See also
List of rivers of Ontario

References

Sources

Rivers of Lanark County
Tributaries of the Ottawa River